Annunciation School may refer to:

Annunciation School (Buffalo, New York), a historic building formerly used as a school, Buffalo, New York, U.S.
Annunciation School (New York City), a K-8 Catholic school, New York City, New York, U.S.

See also
Annunciation (disambiguation)
Annunciation High School (Detroit), Michigan, U.S.
Annunciation Orthodox School, a Greek Orthodox school in Houston, Texas, U.S.